The Commander-in-Chief of the Russian Navy (Russian: Главнокомандующий ВМФ) is the chief commanding authority of the Russian Navy. He is appointed by the President of Russia. The position dates to the period of the Russian Empire. The current Commander-in-Chief of the Russian Navy is Admiral Nikolai Yevmenov.

List of Commanders

Ministers of Sea Forces (1802–1815)

Ministers of the Navy (1815–1917)

On 17 December 1815 the Ministry of Sea Forces was renamed, becoming the Ministry of the Navy.

Commander-in-Chief's Assistant for Naval Affairs (1921–1924)

Commanders-in-Chief of the Naval Forces of the USSR (1924–1937)

People's Commissars for the USSR Navy (1937–1939)

Commanders-in-Chief of the Soviet Navy (1939–1991)

Commander-in-Chief of the Commonwealth of Independent States Navy (1991–1992)

Commanders-in-Chief of the Russian Navy (1992–present)

Notes

References

External links
Official Russian Ministry of Defense website

Russia
Military of Russia
Military of the Soviet Union